United States gubernatorial elections were held in 1906, in 28 states, concurrent with the House and Senate elections, on November 6, 1906 (except in Arkansas, Georgia, Maine, Oregon and Vermont, which held early elections).

In Iowa, the gubernatorial election was held in an even-numbered year for the first time, having previously been held in odd-numbered years with the previous election taking place in 1903.

In Oregon, the gubernatorial election was held in June for the last time, moving to the same day as federal elections from the 1910 elections.

Results

See also 
1906 United States elections
1906–07 United States Senate elections
1906 United States House of Representatives elections

References

Notes 

 
November 1906 events